The 1980 Atlantic Coast Conference baseball tournament was held in Raleigh, North Carolina, from April 22 through 26. Clemson won the tournament and earned the Atlantic Coast Conference's automatic bid to the 1980 NCAA Division I baseball tournament.  The tournament was the first held since 1978, as conflicts with exams caused the cancellation of the 1979 tournament.

Tournament

See also
College World Series
NCAA Division I Baseball Championship

References

2. 2007 ACC Baseball Media Guide

Tournament
Atlantic Coast Conference baseball tournament
Atlantic Coast Conference baseball tournament
Atlantic Coast Conference baseball tournament
20th century in Raleigh, North Carolina
Baseball in North Carolina
College sports in North Carolina
Sports competitions in Raleigh, North Carolina